Siderasis is a genus of monocotyledonous flowering plants in the dayflower family, first described in 1837. It consists of a single known species, Siderasis fuscata, endemic to the State of Rio de Janeiro in southeastern Brazil, though it is also naturalized on the Island of Java in Indonesia.

Common English names of Siderasis fuscata are "bears ears" for their leaves being covered in many tiny "hairs" and their broad oval shape and "brown spiderwort" because the color mix of its foliage sometimes is perceived as "chocolate-colored". 

The upper sides of the leaves are green with silvery and reddish hues and a lighter stripe down the middle; their undersides are reddish purple. 

Its flowers have three blueish purple petals; for their similarity to Tradescantia flowers Siderasia had formerly been included in Tradescantiae.
 
In warmer climates Siderasis can be planted in parks and gardens; in temperate regions it is kept by botanical gardens in glass houses and used as houseplants.

References

Commelinaceae
Monotypic Commelinales genera
Endemic flora of Brazil
Taxa named by Constantine Samuel Rafinesque